Thodraa is a 2018 Tamil-language drama film directed by debutante Madhuraj and stars Prithvi Rajan and newcomer Veena Nandakumar.

Cast

Production 
The film is directed by Madhuraj, a former assistant of Bhagyaraj. The film highlights caste-based issues. Bhagyaraj suggested to Madhuraj to cast Prithvi Rajan in the lead role. Malayalam actress Veena Nandakumar stars opposite Rajan in the film. The film is based on a true incident that occurred in Dharmapuri.

Soundtrack 
The music was composed by R.N. Uthamaraja and Navin Shander. Silambarasan sang a song in the film.

Release 
The film released along with five other films. The Times of India gave the film a rating of two out of five stars and wrote that "A better screenplay and an engaging narration would have made it at least a one time watch". The Deccan Chronicle gave the film the same rating and wrote that "A taut narration and a little bit of coherence would have made it a better product". Cinema Express wrote that "Advertised as a tribute to victims of honour killings, the beyond shoddy filmmaking ends up making this an insult to their memories instead".

References

External links 

 2018 drama films